The Tungabhadra Express is an Express train in India which runs between Kurnool City in Andhra Pradesh and Secunderabad Jn in Telangana. This train is named after the River Tungabhadra. The Secunderabad Division of the South Central Railway division of the Indian Railways administers this train.

In Thamizh, Thunga means sleep, and therefore this slowest train is synonymous to the sleepiness introduced into the passengers due to the lethargy introduced by the slow journey inside this train, ironically hauled by a WDP-4D from Gotti shed.

Numbering
Train number 17023 runs from Secunderabad Jn to Kurnool City while 17024 runs from Kurnool City to Secunderabad Jn.

Rake sharing
This train has rake sharing with 12705/12706 Guntur–Secunderabad Intercity Express.

Route
The train starts from Secunderabad Jn at 07:30 hours and reaches Kurnool City at 12:30 hours the same day. In the return direction it leaves Kurnool City at 15:00 hours and reaches Secunderabad Jn at 19:55 hours the same day. The train runs via , Malakpet, Shadnagar, Jadcherla, Mahabubnagar, Wanaparthy, Gadwal.

Loco
The train is generally hauled by WDG–3A twins of Maula Ali (MLY) loco shed.

Classes
The 16-coach composition contains 1 A/C Chair car, 8 Second sitting, 7 Unreserved and 2 SLR.

See also
 Visakhapatnam Swarna Jayanti Express
 Padmavati Express
 Warangal
 Rudrama Devi
 Bahubali

References
http://indiarailinfo.com/train/tungabhadra-express-17023-sc-to-krnt/1633
http://indiarailinfo.com/train/tungabhadra-express-17024-krnt-to-sc/1634/841/835

Transport in Secunderabad
Express trains in India
Rail transport in Telangana
Rail transport in Andhra Pradesh
Named passenger trains of India